Lucien Marie Le Cam (November 18, 1924 – April 25, 2000) was a mathematician and statistician.

Biography
Le Cam was born November 18, 1924 in Croze, France. His parents were farmers, and unable to afford higher education for him; his father died when he was 13. After graduating from a Catholic school in 1942, he began studying at a seminary in Limoges, but immediately quit upon learning that he would not be allowed to study chemistry there. Instead he continued his studies at a lycée, which did not teach chemistry but did teach mathematics. In May 1944 he joined an underground group, and then went into hiding, returning to his school the following November but soon afterwards moving to Paris, where he began studying at the University of Paris. He graduated in 1945 with the degree Licence ès Sciences.

Le Cam then worked for a hydroelectric utility for five years, while meeting at the University of Paris for a weekly seminar in statistics. In 1950, he was invited to become an instructor at the University of California, Berkeley; he arrived that fall, with his original plan being to stay there a year on leave from his utility position. By the spring of 1951, he had met his future wife (Louise Romig, the daughter of statistician Harry Romig), decided to stay longer, and been admitted to the Ph.D. program. He obtained his Ph.D. in 1952, was appointed Assistant Professor in 1953 and continued working at Berkeley (except for a year in Montreal) beyond his retirement in 1991 until his death.

Contributions
Le Cam was the major figure during the period 1950 – 1990 in the development of abstract general asymptotic theory in mathematical statistics.  He is best known for the general concepts of local asymptotic normality and contiguity, and for developing a metric theory of statistical experiments, recounted in his 1986 magnum opus Asymptotic Methods in Statistical Decision Theory.

Selected publications

References

Further reading

External links
 In Memory of Lucien Le Cam
 Oberwolfach Photo Collection, 1973
 Lucien Le Cam, Portraits of Statisticians

Presidents of the Institute of Mathematical Statistics
French statisticians
Probability theorists
University of California, Berkeley College of Letters and Science faculty
20th-century French mathematicians
1924 births
2000 deaths
University of Paris alumni
Mathematical statisticians
People from Creuse